Winter Ridge is a 2018 British psychological thriller drama film directed by Dom Lenoir and starring Matt Hookings, Olwen Catherine Kelly, Michael McKell, Hannah Waddingham and Alan Ford. It was written by Ross Owen Williams.

Premise
Ryan Barnes (Hookings) is a young detective, dealing with the personal tragedy of his wife being coma-ridden whilst attempting to track down a serial killer who appears to be specifically targeting the vulnerable and elderly.

Cast

 Matt Hookings as Ryan Barnes
 Olwen Catherine Kelly as Jessica
 Hannah Waddingham as Joanne Hill
 Michael McKell  as John Faulkner
 Justin McDonald as Tom Harris
 Alan Ford  as Dale Jacobs
 Ian Pirie as Mike Evans
 Noeleen Comiskey as Jane Evans
 Ella Road as Amanda Jacobs

Production
Filming took place over 17 days around Lynton and Lynmouth in north Devon, England. Several scenes were shot at Petroc College, allowing local performing arts students an opportunity to be involved in filming.

During an interview with The Breeze, director Lenoir explained his view on hoping to raise awareness of dementia, saying "There are an estimated 50 million people suffering from Alzheimer's worldwide and we hope the film is given the platform it deserves for its subject matter to be heard. I'm hoping that this film will raise an interesting debate on the condition."

Release
The film's distributor, Phoenix Worldwide Entertainment, secured three international territory deals, to North America, Italy and China.

Reception

Critical response
Entertainment Focus described the film as "an ambitious project by the film-makers that they pull off admirably" Nerdly called the film "polished, stylised, well acted, well written and uses the most of its location". Alan Ford, in particular, was praised for his performance, with UK Film Review noting he "shines in his brief scenes as Dale Jacobs... struggling with his dementia and, consequently, debating whether or not his life is truly worth living." The Guardian was less enthusiastic, reporting "Winter Ridge is the kind of plucky, low-budget British feature one so wants to like" before describing the end result as "middling... with decidedly shabby edges"

Awards 

The film won more than a dozen awards at independent film festivals on both sides of the Atlantic, including Best Foreign Film at the Hollywood Florida Film Festival, and Best UK Feature and Best British Film at the London Independent Film Festival.

References

External links 

2018 films
2018 independent films
2010s mystery drama films
2010s psychological drama films
2018 psychological thriller films
2010s serial killer films
2018 thriller drama films
British independent films
British serial killer films
British thriller drama films
Murder–suicide in films
2018 drama films
2010s English-language films
2010s British films